Elizabeth Amy Kreiser Weisburger (April 9, 1924 – February 12, 2019) was an American chemist who made significant contributions in medicine and chemistry, specifically chemical carcinogenesis. She worked for nearly 40 years at the National Cancer Institute and received multiple awards for her work.  Weisburger's research in chemical carcinogenesis was necessary in order to find treatments for cancer. Some of Weisburger's work included studying carcinogenesis, looking at the activity of carcinogens, and determining the dangers of chemotherapy drugs. Elizabeth Weisburger is considered a pioneer in chemical carcinogenesis.

Biography 
Elizabeth Amy Kreiser Weisburger was born on April 9, 1924 in Finland, Pennsylvania.  She was one of 10 children.  At a very young age her family moved to Ono, Pennsylvania were Elizabeth grew up.  Both of her parents were teachers along with many of her relatives so Elizabeth began learning at a young age at home.  In 1944, she received a B.S. degree in chemistry from Lebanon Valley College in Annville, Pennsylvania.  Elizabeth accepted a graduate assistantship job at the University of Cincinnati.  In 1947, she received a Ph. D. degree from the University of Cincinnati.  She continued to work at Cincinnati after receiving her degree.  She married John Hans Weisburger in April 1947 who was also a graduate student at the University of Cincinnati.   In 1949, John and Elizabeth Weisburger began postdoctoral studies at the National Cancer Institute. They had three children together and continued to work together until 1972 when John left the National Cancer Institute. In 1974, John and Elizabeth got divorced.

In 1988, Weisburger retired from the National Cancer Institute. She had four grandchildren and latterly worked for a consulting company and tutored children. Weisburger died in Rockville, Maryland in February  2019 at the age of 94.

Career 
Elizabeth Amy Kreiser Weisburger's contributions to science are in the field of chemical carcinogenesis particularly on the molecular level.  Her contributions aided in finding cancer treatments along with preventions.  Her career began at the University of Cincinnati under Professor Francis Earl Ray.  There she researched fluorene compounds for chemotherapeutic agents as well as carcinogenic agents.  In 1949, John and Elizabeth both began postdoctoral work at the National Cancer Institute under Dr. Harold Morris.  His research was in chemical carcinogenesis.  In 1951, Elizabeth became an officer in the Commissioned Corps of the U.S. Public Health Service.  She then began work in a biochemistry lab at the National Cancer Institute.  In 1961, John and Elizabeth together started the Carcinogen Screening Section of the Experimental Pathology Branch at the National Cancer Institute.  In 1974, Elizabeth became chief of the Laboratory of Carcinogen Metabolism.  She then moved to the Division of Cancer Etiology and became the assistant director for chemical carcinogenesis in 1981.  After retiring in 1988 from the National Cancer Institute, she began consulting in toxicology and chemical carcinogenesis.

Awards 
Weisburger received many awards during her career.  Some of them are listed below:
 Sigma Delta Epsilon national honorary member-1977
 Hildebrand Prize of the Chemical Society of Washington-1981
 Garvan Medal of the American Chemical Society-1981
 Iota Sigma Pi national honorary member-1981
 Honorary D.Sc. degree from University of Cincinnati-1981
 Distinguished Service Medal of the U.S. Public Health Service-1985
 Professional Service Award from the Washington Professional chapter of Alpha Chi Sigma-1987
 Distinguished Scientist Award from the D.C. Chapter of the SEBM-1989
 Honorary D.Sc. degree from Lebanon Valley College-1989

References

Scientist in the Spotlight: Elizabeth Weisburger. AICR Science Now. Vol.7 2004.

Grinstein, L.S.; Rose, R.K.; Rafailovich, M.H. Women in Chemistry and Physics: A Bibliographic Sourcebook. Greenwood: 1993.

Shearer, B.F.; Shearer, B.S. Notable Women in the Physical Sciences: A Bibliographic Dictionary. Greenwood: 1997.

1924 births
2019 deaths
21st-century American chemists
American women scientists
Lebanon Valley College alumni
University of Cincinnati alumni
21st-century American women scientists